The 1933 college football season saw the Michigan Wolverines repeat as winners of the Knute Rockne Memorial Trophy as national champion under the Dickinson System.

The unofficial east–west championship game, the Rose Bowl, was between Stanford (8–1–1) who was ranked behind USC and unranked Columbia (7–1). The Columbia Lions won the Rose Bowl game 7–0.

Conference and program changes

Conference changes
Two new conferences began play in 1933:
 Chesapeake Conference – active through the 1936 season
 Southeastern Conference (SEC) – active NCAA Division I FBS conference; formed after its thirteen members broke away from the Southern Conference in 1932.

Membership changes

September
September 23 USC opened its season with a doubleheader against Occidental College, and Whittier College.  Using a combination of varsity and reserves, the Trojans won 39–0 and 51–0, respectively.  Although future President Richard M. Nixon had been on the freshman football team at Whittier, he was not part of the varsity squad that played against USC.  Oregon defeated Linfield College 53–0.  Stanford beat San Jose State 27–0

September 30  Stanford narrowly defeated UCLA 3–0,  USC beat Loyola Marymount 18–0, and Oregon won at Gonzaga 14–0.  Army opened with a 19–6 win over Mercer College.  Minnesota beat visiting South Dakota State 19–6.  Pittsburgh beat Washington & Jefferson 9–0.

October

October 7  USC defeated Washington State 33–0, Stanford beat Santa Clara 7–0, and Oregon got past Portland College 14–7.  Minnesota and Indiana tied 6–6.  Michigan (whose team included Gerald Ford as a center) beat Michigan State 20–6, Purdue beat Ohio University 13–6, and Ohio State rolled over Virginia 75–0.  Army beat Virginia Military Institute (VMI) 32–0 Pittsburgh beat West Virginia 21–0.  Nebraska beat visiting Texas 26–0.  Princeton opened its season with a shutout (40–0) over Amherst.

October 14 In Minneapolis, Minnesota and Purdue played to a 7–7 tie.
In Chicago, Stanford and Northwestern played to a 0–0 tie.  Oregon won at Washington 6–0, and USC beat St. Mary's 14–7.  Army defeated Delaware 52–0 and Pittsburgh beat Navy 34–6.  Ohio State defeated Vanderbilt 20–0.  Michigan beat Cornell 40–0.  Nebraska won at Iowa State 20–0.  Princeton recorded its second shutout, a 45–0 win over Williams.  Tennessee suffered its first defeat since 1930, losing 10–2 against Duke.

October 21 Michigan beat visiting Ohio State 13–0.
Minnesota (1–0–2) hosted  Pittsburgh (3–0–0), with the home team Gophers winning, 7–3.  Purdue won at Chicago 14–0.  In Portland, USC and Oregon State played to a 0–0 tie.  Stanford won at the University of San Francisco, 20–13.  In Cleveland Army beat Illinois 6–0.  Nebraska won at Kansas State 9–0.  Oregon beat Idaho 19–0 in a Friday Night game.  Princeton beat Columbia, 20–0, to stay unscored upon.

October 28 USC narrowly won at California, 6–3, Oregon won at UCLA 7–0, and Stanford lost at Washington 6–0.  Michigan won at Chicago 28–0, Ohio State beat Northwestern 12–0, Minnesota beat Iowa 19–7, and Purdue won at Wisconsin 14–0. Army won at Yale 21–0.  Pittsburgh won at Notre Dame 14–0.  Nebraska beat Oklahoma 16–7.  Princeton narrowly won, but stayed unscored upon, with a 6–0 win over Washington & Lee.

November
November 4 Oregon beat Utah 26–7.  Stanford beat the Olympic Club 21–0 and Army beat Coe College 34–0.  Purdue beat Carnegie Tech 17–7.  Michigan won at Illinois, 7–6, Ohio State beat Indiana 21–0.
Minnesota and Northwestern played to a 0–0 tie.  Pittsburgh beat Centre College 37–0.  Nebraska stayed unbeaten with a 26–0 win over Missouri.  Princeton extended its shutout streak to five with a 33–0 win at Brown.

November 11  In Los Angeles, USC (6–0–1) hosted Stanford (5–1–1).   The Trojans suffered their first defeat in 27 games, losing 13–7, in a game that ultimately decided the Pacific Coast championship.  
Michigan defeated Iowa 5–3.  At Portland, Oregon beat Oregon State, 13–3 to extend its record to 8–0–0.  Army won at Harvard 27–0.  In Phildadelphia, Ohio State beat Penn 20–7 and Purdue won at Notre Dame 19–0.
Pittsburgh beat Duquesne 7–0 and Nebraska defeated Kansas 12–0
Princeton beat Dartmouth, 7–0, for its sixth straight shutout.

November 18 USC (6–1–1) handed visiting Oregon (8–0–0) its first defeat, 26–0.  Michigan (6–0–0) and Minnesota (3–0–3), both unbeaten,  played to a scoreless tie.  Pittsburgh (6–1–0) hosted Nebraska (5–0–0) and won 6–0.  Princeton beat visiting Navy 13–0.  In seven games, it had outscored its opponents 164–0.  Stanford beat Montana 33–7.  Army defeated Pennsylvania Military Institute, 12–0.  Ohio State won at Wisconsin 6–0.   Purdue suffered its first loss of the season, falling 14–6 to visiting Iowa.

November 25 Princeton was finally scored upon, after holding its first seven opponents scoreless.  The streak was broken by Rutgers, which lost 26–6.  USC won at Notre Dame, 19–0 and Stanford beat California 7–3.  The annual Army–Navy Game took place in Philadelphia, and Army won 12–7.  Ohio State closed its season with a 7–6 win over Illinois and Michigan won at Northwestern 13–0, Minnesota beat Wisconsin 6–3, and Purdue won at Indiana 19–3.  Nebraska beat Iowa 7–6

Thanksgiving Day fell on November 30 in 1933.  Nebraska defeated Oregon State 22–0 to close its season at 8–1–0.  Oregon won at St. Mary's, 13–7.  Pittsburgh beat Carnegie Tech 16–0.

December
December 2 In Los Angeles, USC (8–1–1) hosted Georgia (8–1–0) and won 31–0
Army (9–0–0) and Notre Dame (2–5–1) met at Yankee Stadium.  The Fighting Irish pulled off a 13–12 upset.  Princeton, no longer having to maintain a streak of shutouts, won at Yale 27–2 to finish as the nation's only unbeaten and untied team.

1934 Rose Bowl

The Columbia Lions defeated the Stanford Indians (now Cardinal) 7–0. Cliff Montgomery, the Columbia quarterback, was named the Rose Bowl Player Of The Game when the award was created in 1953 and selections were made retroactively.

Other bowls
 Dixie Classic

Conference standings

Major conference standings

Independents

Minor conferences

Minor conference standings

Dickinson System
The AP sportswriters' poll would not begin continuously until 1936. (although, the first time was a one instance publishing in 1934) Frank G. Dickinson, an economics professor at the University of Illinois, had invented the Dickinson System to rank colleges based upon their records and the strength of their opposition.  The system was originally designed to rank teams in the Big Nine (later the Big Ten) conference.  Chicago clothing manufacturer Jack Rissman then persuaded Dickinson to rank the nation's teams under the system, and the Rockne Memorial Trophy was awarded to the winning university.

In an AP story with the caption "Figure This Out!", the system was explained:
"For each victory of a first division team over another first division team, the winner gets 30 points and the loser 15 points.  For each tie between two first
division teams, each team gets 12.5 points.  For each victory of a first division team over a second division team, the first division winner gets 20 points and the second division loser 10 points.  For each tie between two second division teams, each gets 15 points.  For each tie between a first division team and a second division team, the first division team gets 15 points and the second division team gets 20 points.  Then, after each team has been given its quota of points its final "score" is tabulated by taking an average on the number of games played."

Final Dickinson rankings
Michigan (7–0–1), Minnesota (4–0–4) and Princeton (9–0) were all unbeaten, and Princeton was untied as well.  Based on its schedule, Michigan was ranked highest by Professor Dickinson.  As in 1932, Dickinson, an economics professor at the University of Illinois, included four Big Ten Conference teams among the best in the US.  In 1933, they were Michigan, Minnesota, Ohio State, and Purdue.

Awards and honors

All-Americans

The consensus All-America team included:

Statistical leaders
Player scoring most points: Beattie Feathers, Tennessee, 78

References